Haiku is a Japanese poem of seventeen syllables, in three lines of five, seven, and five, traditionally evoking images of the natural world.

Haiku may also refer to:
 Haiku in English, the English-language derivative of the Japanese poetic form
 Haiku (operating system), an open-source re-creation of BeOS
 Haiku (2015 film), a Tamil film

Places 
 Haiku, Hawaii
 Haiku-Pauwela, Hawaii
 Haiku Valley, a valley in the Koolau Range in the Hawaiian Islands
 12477 Haiku, a main-belt asteroid

Music 
 Haiku (Don Ellis album), recorded in 1973
 Haiku (Joey Calderazzo album), recorded in 2002
 Haiku, a 1995 jazz album by saxophonist Lee Konitz
 "Haiku", a song by American rock band Tally Hall on their debut album Marvin's Marvelous Mechanical Museum

See also 
 Haiku d'Etat, an alternative hip hop group
 Haiku Tunnel, an office comedy about the struggle between tempness and permness
 Haiku Stairs, a hiking trail on Oahu, Hawaii
 Haikou, a city on the island of Hainan in the People's Republic of China